= Yu-En Yen =

Weaver from Taiwan

Yu-En Yen (Kavalan language: Aing Banday, born 1938) was born in the Kodic Tribe of Fengbin Township, Hualien County and was recognized by the Taiwanese Ministry of Culture in 2021 as the preserver of important traditional crafts: "Kavalan banana fiber weaving (ni tenunan tu benina)."

== Biography ==
Yu-En Yen was born in 1938 in Kodic Village. Her father, A-Jih Yen, was a member of the Kalewan tribe. In 1955, she married Wan-Lai Jie at the age of 17, who was seven years her senior. They first lived in Fengbin. Three years after their marriage, Wan-Lai Jie left his job at the Fengbin Township Office, and the family moved back to Xinshe to settle. Yu-En Yen was 28 years old at that time.

Yu-En Yen and Wan-Lai Jie returned to the Kalewan tribe in Yilan in 1988. They heard from their aunt and A-Mei Gao that the Kavalan people used to wear clothes made of fabric woven from banana fiber; wearing such clothes represented a certain social status. No one was able to weave banana fiber fabric at the time they returned, which amazed Yu-En Yen.

In 2001, during the "Dr. Mackay's Collection of Taiwanese Aboriginal Artifacts Exhibition" held at the Shung Ye Museum of Formosan Aborigines, a sample of a Kavalan woman's ceremonial skirt was displayed. Upon seeing this display, Yu-En Yen was deeply moved. She became determined to revive weaving.

Later, Yu-En Yen returned to Xinshe Tribe and, with her husband, visited tribal elders such as Abi, Ibay, and Ayok. They attempted to retrieve the traditional banana fiber weaving techniques from the childhood memories of the elders. Initially, Yu-En Yen learned from Ibay various techniques, including how to operate a ground loom. In 2005, they established the "Xinshe Banana Fiber Workshop." According to Yu-En Yen, at the beginning of their journey to revive the traditional craft, no one was weaving banana fiber fabric. They relied on the memories of the tribe's elders, who had seen their grandmothers weaving banana fiber, and started experimenting based on their descriptions. After multiple failures, they finally achieved results. Since the traditional loom frame was lost, they inserted four pillars directly into the ground to set up a new loom.

Yu-En Yen is conducts the entire process of Kavalan banana fiber weaving and is familiar with the indigenous terminologies regarding tools and techniques. Before harvesting banana trees, extracting banana sheaths, scraping banana fibers, and weaving, she performs the ritual of paspaw (offering) to seek ancestral blessings.

Yen was part of the team that designed the uniforms that Taiwanese athletes wore at the 2024 Olympics.

== Honors and awards ==
- May 2021 Recognized by the Ministry of Culture (Taiwan) as the preserver of important traditional crafts, commonly referred to as a "Living National Treasure."
- August 2021 Received the Indigenous Wisdom Elderly Award from the World Indigenous Nations Higher Education Consortium (WINHEC).
